Pseudotaranis strongi is a species of sea snail, a marine gastropod mollusk in the family Pseudomelatomidae, the turrids and allies.

Description

Distribution
This marine species occurs off California, USA.

References

 Arnold, Ralph. The paleontology and stratigraphy of the marine Pliocene and Pleistocene of San Pedro, California. Vol. 3. The Academy, 1903.
 McLean J.H. (1996). The Prosobranchia. In: Taxonomic Atlas of the Benthic Fauna of the Santa Maria Basin and Western Santa Barbara Channel. The Mollusca Part 2 – The Gastropoda. Santa Barbara Museum of Natural History. volume 9: 1-160

External links
 
 Natural History Museum, Los Angeles: image
 Natural History Museum, Los Angeles: images

strongi
Gastropods described in 1903